USS California may refer to:

  was a screw sloop originally named Minnetonka
  was a  commissioned in 1907, renamed San Diego in 1914 and sunk by a mine in World War I
  served during World War I as a motor patrol boat in New York City Harbor; later renamed Hauoli
  was a motor patrol boat in San Francisco Harbor during World War I.
 was a  active in World War II
  was the lead ship of her class of nuclear-powered guided missile cruisers; known as the "Golden Grizzly."
  is a  commissioned in 2011

See also
 
 

United States Navy ship names